The Burdur spring minnow (Pseudophoxinus burduricus) is a species of freshwater fish in the family Cyprinidae. It is found in several springs and streams in the Central Anatolia Region in and in the surroundings of Lake Burdur and Lake Salda basins in Turkey.

References

Pseudophoxinus
Endemic fauna of Turkey
Fish described in 2007